Cairston is a village on Mainland, in Orkney, Scotland. The settlement is within the parish of Stromness.

References

External links

Canmore - Bu of Cairston site record
Scapaflow.co - Bu of Cairston
Scottish Screen Archive - Local News: Bu of Cairston Broch with video from 1978.

Villages on Mainland, Orkney